System 6 or System/6 may refer to:

Computing
 IBM Office System/6, a minicomputer developed by IBM; premiered in 1977

Operating systems: 

 System Software 6, the Apple operating system introduced in 1988
 Version 6 Unix, released in 1975

Other
 System 6, line of BMW Motorrad helmets
 System 6, line of Cannondale bicycles 
 6.0 system, the figure skating judging system
 D6 System, the  role-playing game system
 Signalling System 6, telephony signaling protocols
 STS-6 (Space Transportation System-6), the Space Shuttle mission

See also
 Series 6 (disambiguation)